The Club Swan 42 was designed by German Frers and built by Nautor's Swan and first launched in 2006. It was initially launched and referred to as New York Yacht Club 42 as the design was commissioned by the club following a tendering process.

The boat has had significant racing success, both as a one-design and under rating rules such as IRC and ORC, and was used for the biennial Rolex New York Yacht Club Invitational Cup from the event's inception in 2009 through 2017. This regatta is an invitational event for teams of amateur sailors representing yacht clubs from around the world.

External links
 Nautor Swan
 Club Swan 42 Class Association
 German Frers Official Website

References

Sailing yachts
Keelboats
2000s sailboat type designs
Sailboat types built by Nautor Swan
Sailboat type designs by Germán Frers